Abortion in Belarus has been legal since November 23, 1955, when Belarus was a republic of the Soviet Union. The current abortion legislation dates from December 31, 1987, and is one of the most liberal abortion laws in Europe. Abortion is allowed on request up to 12 weeks, and in specific circumstances, on a variety of grounds, until 28 weeks.

The 1987 law allows abortion for the traditional reasons of harm or death to the fetus and/or mother, rape and incest, as well as: 
 the death of the husband during pregnancy,
 a jail sentence for either the mother or father,
 a court order stripping the pregnant woman of parental rights,
 if a household already exceeds five children,
 if the relationship between mother and father ends in divorce,
 or a family history which includes mental or physical disabilities.

Once a popular method of birth control, abortions exceeded live births two-to-one in 1995. The rate had fallen by over 75%, with abortions numbering 42,000 (or 39% of the live birth rate) in 2008.

, the abortion rate was 14.7 abortions per 1000 women aged 15–44 years.

References

Belarus
Healthcare in Belarus
Law of Belarus
Belarus
Women in Belarus